The Reckless Buckaroo is a 1935 American Western film directed by Harry L. Fraser and written by Zarah Tazil. The film stars Bill Cody, Bill Cody Jr., Betty Mack, Buzz Barton, Roger Williams and Ed Cassidy. The film was released on April 2, 1935, by Crescent Pictures Corporation.

Plot

Cast           
Bill Cody as Bill Carter
Bill Cody Jr. as Ted Simms
Betty Mack as Diane Madden
Buzz Barton as Drake
Roger Williams as Hal Bost
Ed Cassidy as Sheriff Madden 
Lew Meehan as Lord
Milburn Morante as Desert Lew
Budd Buster as Pete

References

External links
 

1935 films
1930s English-language films
American Western (genre) films
1935 Western (genre) films
Films directed by Harry L. Fraser
American black-and-white films
1930s American films